Emmanuel Bertrand-Bocandé (1812–1881) was an explorer, businessman, and French colonial administrator who helped spread French influence in Basse Casamance, Senegal, specifically on the island of Carabane. He left a valuable account of the French perspective on this region during colonial times.

Biography 
The son of René Bertrand and Olive Bocandé, Emmanuel Bertrand-Bocandé was born in Nantes on July 3, 1812.

He had control of Carabane from 1849–1857. He was replaced by Bourdeny.

He died in Paris on November 28, 1881.

Works 
 
  First part: Vol. 11, May–June 1849, . Read online at Gallica
  Second part: Vol. 12, July–August 1849, . Read online at Gallica

See also

Bibliography

References

1812 births
1881 deaths
Explorers of Africa
French explorers
History of Senegal
Businesspeople from Nantes